"One Step Closer" is the debut single of British pop group S Club Juniors, written by Cathy Dennis, Mike Percy, and Tim Lever. Produced by Nick Foster and Mike Rose, it was released as the first single from their first album, Together (2002). "One Step Closer" was issued on 22 April 2002 in the United Kingdom, where it peaked at number two on the UK Singles Chart, losing out to the number-one spot by 1,000 copies. The song served as the theme for the US reality television series American Juniors (2003).

Composition
Frankie Sandford sings the first verse. Calvin Goldspink sings the first part of the first and the third bridges. Jay Asforis sings the second part of the first and the third bridges and the first part of the second bridge. Daisy Evans sings the second verse. Hannah Richings sings a backing vocal during the second verse. Stacey McClean sings the second part of the second bridge and backing vocals during the final chorus. Rochelle Wiseman sings backing vocals in the final chorus. Aaron Renfree does not have any solos in this song. Recording was produced by Tim Lever and done at Hollywood's famed Radio Recorders by engineer Jordan Winsen.

Release and chart performance
The single was released in the United Kingdom on 22 April 2002. During its first week on sale, it reached number two on the UK Singles Chart, selling approximately 84,400 copies. It remained within the top 40 for 11 weeks, until mid-July. In Ireland, the song peaked at number five. It also entered the top 20 of the European Hot 100 Singles chart, reaching number 14.

Music video
The video shows the band in a classroom which changes into a disco. The noise attracts the attention of the headmaster (played by Lee Cornes) who arrives only to find it a classroom again.

Track listings
UK CD1
 "One Step Closer"
 "Reach" (special S Club 7 and S Club Juniors version)
 "Together"
 "One Step Closer" (CD-ROM)

UK CD2
 "One Step Closer"
 "One Step Closer" (karaoke version)
 "S Club Juniors Girls Reveal Their Secrets to the S Club 7 Boys"

UK cassette single
 "One Step Closer"
 "One Step Closer" (acapella version)

Credits and personnel
Credits are lifted from the Together album booklet.

Studios
 Recorded at Rose & Foster Studios (London, England)
 Mastered at Transfermation (London, England)

Personnel

 Cathy Dennis – writing
 Mike Percy – writing
 Tim Lever – writing
 Paul Gendler – guitars
 Nina Cockburn – violin
 Nick Foster – production, arrangement
 Mike Rose – production, arrangement
 Jewels & Stone – additional production and mix
 Dean Murphy – recording
 Ben Foster – additional arrangement and score
 Richard Dowling – mastering

Charts

Weekly charts

Year-end charts

Certifications

American Juniors version

"One Step Closer" was covered by American Juniors, recorded by the ten finalists on the American Juniors television program, not just the five who won. It was released by Jive Records on 12 August 2003. This version reached number two in Canada but did not chart in the US.

Track listing
 "One Step Closer"
 "Kids in America" (pop mix)
 "Kids in America" (rock mix)

Charts

References

19 Recordings singles
2002 debut singles
2003 singles
American Juniors songs
Polydor Records singles
S Club 8 songs
Songs written by Cathy Dennis
Songs written by Tim Lever